The Annapolis-class destroyer escort was a two-ship class of destroyer escorts that saw service with the Royal Canadian Navy and Canadian Forces from the 1960s to the 1990s. The final version of the  design, the class was used extensively for anti-submarine warfare purposes. Both ships were sunk as artificial reefs after being retired, one on each coast of Canada.

Design and description

Initially, the ships displaced  and had a complement of 228.

The ships were powered by two Babcock & Wilcox boilers connected to the two-shaft English-Electric geared steam turbines providing .

The ships were initially armed with two /50 calibre dual-purpose guns mounted in a single turret forward. The extra topweight of the helicopter required the return of the American Mk 33 3-inch gun over the heavier 3-inch/70 calibre guns used on the preceding class. The guns could fire 45 – 50 rounds per minute with a lifespan of 2,050 rounds. The guns were placed in a Mk 33 mount. The mounting allowed the guns to elevate from −15° to 85°. The elevation rate was 30° per second and train rate was 24° per second. The mounts could train 360°.

For anti-submarine warfare, the ships were armed with a Mk 10 Limbo mortar. Placed on stabilized mountings, the projectiles always entered the water at the same angle. They also had a Mk.4 thrower with homing torpedoes.

Initially the ships were outfitted with one SPS-12 air search radar, one SPS-10B surface search radar, and one Sperry Mk.2 navigation radar. For sensing below the surface, the class was given one SQS-501 high frequency bottom profiler sonar, one SQS-502 high frequency mortar control sonar, one SQS-503 hull mounted active search sonar and one SQS-504 VDS medium frequency active search sonar. For fire control purposes they were given one Mk 60 GFCS fire control with SPG-48 tracker (GUNAR).

The two Annapolis-class destroyers were built late enough to incorporate the helicopter hangar retrofitted to the St. Laurent class and the "Beartrap" haul-down device. This allowed the destroyer escorts to deploy with one CH-124 Sea King helicopter.

DELEX refit

The DEstroyer Life EXtension (DELEX) refit was born out of the need to extend the life of the steam-powered destroyer escorts of the Canadian Navy in the 1980s until the next generation of surface ship was built. Encompassing all the classes based on the initial St. Laurent (the remaining St. Laurent,  Mackenzie, and Annapolis-class vessels), the DELEX upgrades were meant to improve their ability to combat modern Soviet submarines, and to allow them to continue to operate as part of NATO task forces.

Nipigon underwent a DELEX refit in 1982 and Annapolis followed in 1984. The Annapolis class received the same sensor and communications upgrades that others in the St Laurent family of ships received, including the installation of a new tactical data system (ADLIPS), updated radars and sonars, fire control and satellite navigation. They also received the new Canadian Tactical Towed Array Sensor or CANTASS which was a long-range towed sonar array that was affixed to the stern, which replaced the older VDS. The class also received a new lattice mast. The AN/SPS-503 radar was installed, the AN/SPS-10D replaced the older, AN/SPS-10 model. The AN/SQS-502, AN/SQS-503 and SQS-10/11 sonars were removed and replaced by AN/SQS-505(V) in a fixed dome below the waterline. The installation of the two ADLIPS units allowed the vessels to better integrate into NATO units.

They were given  torpedo tubes to allow them to fire Mark 46 torpedoes. However, the Limbo mortar was removed in order to install the CANTASS. This visibly altered the overall appearance of the ships. The AN/SQR-504 was also replaced by the CANTASS. The Super RBOC chaff system was installed during the refit.

Ships

Service history
Nipigon was laid down by Marine Industries Ltd on 5 August 1960 and Annapolis by  Halifax Shipyards on 2 September 1961. Both ships commissioned in 1964; Nipigon on 30 May and Annapolis on 19 December.

Both ships spent the majority of their career split between Canada's Pacific and Atlantic coasts with the Annapolis being at Esquimalt and Nipigon at Halifax. They spent most of their careers participating in training exercises, such as Ocean Safari '87 or representing Canada at ceremonial situations, such as commemorating the Battle of the Atlantic in May 1993 at Liverpool.

In 1994, Annapolis participated in Operation Forward Action off Haiti. In 1995, after illegal fishing had taken place in Canada's exclusive economic zone, Nipigon was sent to support Canadian Coast Guard and Fisheries vessels in apprehending the perpetrators, in what became called the Turbot War.

Both Annapolis and Nipigon were paid off on 1 July 1998. Nipigon was towed to Rimouski, Quebec and sunk as an artificial reef off the coast. After years of court battles, Annapolis was sunk as an artificial reef off Gambier Island, British Columbia in 2015.

References

Notes

Citations

Sources

External links 

 Canadian Navy of Yesterday & Today: Annapolis class destroyer escort
Canadian Navy

Destroyer classes